Denisa Krajčovičová (born 18 November 1968) is a former professional tennis player from Slovakia. From 1991 to 1996, she was known under her married name Denisa Szabová.

Biography
Krajčovičová began playing professionally in the late 1980s, originally under the flag of Czechoslovakia. 

She made the semifinals of the 1991 San Marino WTA Tour tournament. 

In 1993, she began competing as a Slovakian and represented the Slovakia Fed Cup team in their 1995 World Group playoff tie against Paraguay. 

She made another WTA Tour semifinal at Zagreb in 1995. 

Towards the end of her career, she peaked as a doubles player, making a WTA Tour final at the 1995 Warsaw Cup and the following year winning a $75k Bratislava ITF Circuit tournament.

WTA career finals

Doubles: 1 (runner-up)

ITF finals

Singles: 5 (1–4)

Doubles: 25 (9–16)

References

External links
 
 
 

1968 births
Living people
Slovak female tennis players
Czechoslovak female tennis players
Tennis players from Bratislava